, also known as  was a black and white Japanese anime series that aired from 1961 to 1964. It is the first anime television series.

Story
The show was about historical events through a character who was not aware of "what happened on this day in history".  Sometimes photographs and film footage were mixed in with the animations to explain what historical event had taken place. The research archives came from the newspaper where the director's Fuku-chan manga was printing at the time.

Production
The series began in 1961 as a series of 3 minute shorts that comprised a mix of animation, film footage and stills taken from the research archives of Mainichi Shinbun. Director Ryūichi Yokoyama's Fuku-chan manga was running in the newspaper at the time. This first series was broadcast as Instant History on Fuji TV and was sponsored by Meiji Seika. The series was then recycled into Otogi Manga Calendar which was broadcast on Tokyo Broadcasting System in 1962 and was sponsored by Kirin Company. Parts of the series are also found in Knowledgeable University which was broadcast on Mainichi Broadcasting System in 1966.

See also
 History of Anime

References

External links
 
Otogi Manga Calendar in Animemorial

1961 anime television series debuts
1964 Japanese television series endings
TBS Television (Japan) original programming